John Chong Ching is a Hong Kong film producer and presenter. He is one of the most successful producers of Hong Kong cinema beginning with the Golden Age of Bruce Lee and Jackie Chan in the 1970s and 1980s. He is now a veteran film producer of Media Asia Group, the company behind the Infernal Affairs trilogy.

Career
Chong has spent his entire career in the local entertainment scene. He started working for Television Broadcasts Ltd. (TVB), Hong Kong's premier television channel, and also wrote lyrics for Cantopop songs.  In 1994, he was working at a satellite network Star TV Ltd. when he and six partners decided the time was ripe for an entrepreneurial approach to filmmaking. Dubbing themselves the Seven Samurai, they aimed to reverse a sharp decline in the Hong Kong film business as moviegoers rejected the poor quality of locally produced films.

They began taking lessons from Hollywood, insisting, for instance, that all their stars sign the detailed contracts necessary to distribute Media Asia's films overseas.  Chong tightened controls on costs, and Media Asia earned $5.1 million on sales of $39 million, which is considered to be minuscule numbers by Hollywood standards, but in Hong Kong, a solid success.

Chong continues to work as a producer for Media Asia, with his goal to expand in the Mainland Chinese market, and to later take the company public.

References

External links

Business Week: John Chong Executive Director, Media Asia Group, Hong Kong

Hong Kong people
Hong Kong film producers
Hong Kong film presenters
Chinese film producers
Living people
1959 births